Mélanie Turgeon (born October 21, 1976, in Alma, Quebec) is a skier and former member of the Canadian national ski team.

A member of the Mont Ste. Anne ski club, Turgeon joined the Canadian national ski team in 1992 at the age of only sixteen. Two years later she collected five medals at the World Junior Championships, including two gold medals in the giant slalom and combined events.

She competed at the 1994 Winter Olympics in Lillehammer, the 1998 Winter Olympics in Nagano and the 2002 Winter Olympics in Salt Lake City.

In 2003, she won a gold medal in the downhill event at the FIS Alpine World Ski Championships in St. Moritz.

Turgeon sustained a back injury that forced her to sit out the entire 2003–2004 season. She announced her retirement from skiing in October 2005.

References

External links
 
 

1976 births
Canadian female alpine skiers
Alpine skiers at the 1994 Winter Olympics
Alpine skiers at the 1998 Winter Olympics
Alpine skiers at the 2002 Winter Olympics
Olympic alpine skiers of Canada
French Quebecers
People from Alma, Quebec
Sportspeople from Quebec
Living people
20th-century Canadian women
21st-century Canadian women